The SeaOrbiter, also known as Sea Orbiter (two words), is a proposed oceangoing research vessel. Construction was due to start in 2014 but by May 2015, only the Eye of SeaOrbiter has been completed, and as of early 2021, there is no news of any other construction.

The SeaOrbiter is planned to allow scientists and others a residential yet mobile research station positioned under the oceans' surface, with laboratories, workshops, living quarters and a pressurized deck to support divers and submarines.

SeaOrbiter is a project of the "Floating oceanographic laboratory" organisation. It is headed by French architect Jacques Rougerie, oceanographer Jacques Piccard and astronaut Jean-Loup Chrétien.

Description
As proposed, the laboratory would be a semi-submersible oceangoing craft weighing .

It is designed to float vertically and drift with the ocean currents but has two small propellers allowing it to modify its trajectory and maneuver in confined waters. Underwater robots would be sent from the laboratory to explore the seabed. The hull would be made of an alloy of aluminum and magnesium.

See also
 Ben Franklin (PX-15), a 1968 research vessel designed to house a six-man crew for up to 30 days of oceanographic study in the depths of the Gulf Stream.
 Earth 300, a proposed superyacht intended for scientific research
 NEEMO, ongoing NASA program

References

External links

Research vessels of France
Research stations
Research submarines of France
Human analog missions
Proposed ships
2013 in France
2013 in science
2013 in transport